hr-iNFO is a German, public radio station owned and operated by the Hessischer Rundfunk (HR).

References

Radio stations in Germany
Radio stations established in 2004
2004 establishments in Germany
Mass media in Frankfurt
Hessischer Rundfunk